Montréal-Laurier was a former provincial electoral district in the Montreal region of Quebec, Canada that elected members to the Legislative Assembly of Quebec.

It was created for the 1912 election from part of Hochelaga electoral district.  Its final election was in 1962.  It disappeared in the 1966 election and its successor electoral district was Laurier.

Members of the Legislative Assembly
 Napoléon Turcot, Liberal (1912–1919)
 Ernest Poulin, Liberal (1919–1923)
 Alfred Duranleau, Conservative Party (1923–1927)
 Ernest Poulin, Liberal (1927–1935)
 Zénon Lesage, Action liberale nationale (1935–1936)
 Charles-Auguste Bertrand, Liberal (1936–1939)
 Paul Gauthier, Liberal (1939–1944)
 André Laurendeau, Bloc populaire canadien (1944–1948)
 Paul Provençal, Union Nationale (1948–1954)
 Arsène Gagné, Union Nationale (1955–1960)
 René Lévesque, Liberal (1960–1966)

References
 Election results (National Assembly)
 Election results (QuebecPolitique.com)

Former provincial electoral districts of Quebec